Cybister lateralimarginalis is a species of beetle native to the Palearctic, including Europe, the Middle East and North Africa.

External links
Cybister lateralimarginalis on Fauna Europaea

Dytiscidae
Beetles described in 1774
Taxa named by Charles De Geer